Mahmutgazi is a village in the Çal District of Denizli Province in Turkey.

References

Villages in Çal District